Squill is a common name for several lily-like plants and may refer to:

Drimia maritima, medicinal plant native to the Mediterranean, formerly classified as Scilla maritima
Scilla, a genus of plants cultivated for their ornamental flowers, native to Europe and Asia
Puschkinia scilloides, a bulbous perennial resembling Scilla also cultivated for its ornamental flowers

It may also refer to
SQL (Structured Query Language), used to manage databases.